İmamoğlu is a city and district in Adana Province in the Mediterranean region of Turkey, a small agricultural community on a small plain in the hills between the cities of Adana and Kozan, 45 km from Adana, 27 km from Kozan. The city has a population of 20,593 (as of 2010).

References

External links
 District governorate's official website 
 District municipality's official website 

 
Districts of Adana Province
Populated places in Adana Province